Live @ the Zanzibar (also titled as Live PA#11: Live @ the Zanzibar) is a live album released on May 12, 2009 by the Washington, D.C.-based go-go band Rare Essence. The album was recorded live on March 18, 2009 at the now defunct music venue "Zanzibar on the Waterfront", formerly located in Southwest, Washington, D.C.

Track listing
"Intro" – 0:46
"Hey Young World" – 4:36
"Miss Independent" – 8:56
"All the Way to Heaven" – 9:22
"Party Lights" – 7:27
"Blame It" – 7:56
"Happy Birthday" – 7:29
"Move If You Wanna" – 6:25
"Show Off" – 7:33
"Ur Lookin Luvable" – 6:31
"Got Money" – 5:17

References

External links
Live @ the Zanzibar at Discogs

2009 live albums
Rare Essence albums